Laurette T. Koellner is an American business executive,  the former president of Boeing International.

Early life and education
Koellner was raised in Brooklyn, and attended college at the University of Central Florida (UCF). She earned a Bachelor of Science degree in Business Management from UCF in 1977, and an MBA from Stetson University in 1980.

Career

McDonnell Douglas/Boeing
After earning her bachelor's degree in 1977, Koellner began work at McDonnell Douglas as a contract analyst. She spent 19 years at McDonnell Douglas, with an end position of vice president of Internal Audit. After the Boeing-McDonnell Douglas merger in 1997, she remained with Boeing, first as vice president and general auditor, before being named vice president and corporate controller in 1999. In 2000, she was named the senior vice president of the Shared Services group. From 2002-2004, she served as a member of the office of the chairman, as well as  the company's chief administration and human resources officer (a position she held until 2004). In 2004, Koellner was named the president of Connexion by Boeing, a position she held until 2006, when she was named the president of Boeing International. She remained in this position until her retirement from Boeing in 2008.

ILFC
In 2012, she was named executive chairman at the International Lease Finance Corporation (ILFC), a subsidiary of AIG. The newly created position made her the company's most senior executive, overseeing ILFC CEO Henri Courpron, following revelations that Courpron had been involved in a personal relationship with an employee. As head of ILFC reporting to AIG CEO Robert Benmosche, she stepped down from AIG’s board of directors. In 2012, she announced that she would step down once AIG’s planned sale of the unit was approved. The sale to AerCap was completed in May 2014.

Board positions
In 2003, she was elected to the board of directors of Sara Lee Corporation as the chairman of the audit committee. When Sara Lee split into Hillshire Brands and Douwe Egberts, she maintained her board position until Hillshire merged with Tyson Foods.

In 2009, she was elected the chairman of the audit committee on the board of directors at Celestica, Inc. In 2009, she was also named an independent director of American International Group (AIG). She remained in this position through AIG's repayment of its $182.5 billion in government loans. In 2014 she was elected member of the Board of Directors for Papa Johns pizza, and in 2015 as a member of the Goodyear board. In September 2015, she joined the board of directors of the steel company Nucor.

Advisory positions
Koellner serves on the Dean's Advisory Board of the UCF College of Business Administration, and has also served on the Board of Regents for the University of Portland. She is also a member of the Council on Foreign Relations.

Recognition

 2003: UCF College of Business Administration Hall of Fame
 2005: Distinguished Alumnus Award from UCF.
 2011: Distinguished Alumni Award from Stetson University.
 "Audit committee financial expert" by the New York Stock Exchange.
 2014: Featured as the highest-ranking female in the history of the company in the book Trailblazers: The Women of The Boeing Company

References

Living people
University of Central Florida alumni
Stetson University alumni
American women business executives
American business executives
University of Portland people
Year of birth missing (living people)
21st-century American women